Abdulmohsen Assiri (Arabic: عبد المحسن عسيري; born 11 June 1990 in Riyadh) is a Saudi football player who currently plays as a midfielder for Damac.

References

1990 births
Living people
Sportspeople from Riyadh
Saudi Arabian footballers
Association football midfielders
Al Nassr FC players
Al-Raed FC players
Al-Fayha FC players
Damac FC players
Saudi First Division League players
Saudi Professional League players